The 2022–23 T1 League season is the second season of the T1 League, with the Kaohsiung Aquas, the New Taipei CTBC DEA, the Taichung Suns, the Tainan TSG GhostHawks, the TaiwanBeer HeroBears and the Taoyuan Leopards participating in this competition. The regular season started on October 29, 2022, and ends on April 23, 2023. The All-Star Game was played on February 28.

Teams

Season Format 
 Each team plays against another six times, three at home and three on the road, respectively. Each team plays 30 matches total in the regular season.
 Play-in Series: Best-of-three series. The series are contested by the teams that finished the regular season as the fourth seed and fifth seed. The fourth seed is awarded a one-win advantage. The winner can qualify to the semifinals series.
 Semifinals Series: Best-of-five series. Matchup is decided by seeding in regular season. The first seed plays against the winner of play-in series. The second seed plays against the third seed. The winners can qualify for the finals series.
 Finals Series: Best-of-seven series. The series are contested by the winners of semifinals series.

Import Players Restrictions 
 Each team is able to register 2 or 3 general import players and 1 type-III player.
 Each team is able to select 2 to 3 import players (including at least 1 type-III player) into active roster in each match.
 8-Imports-In-4-Quarters Rule : each quarter can have 2 import players or 1 import player and 1 type-III player on the court.
 Type-III player eligibility:
 (1) Naturalized players
 (2) Asian import players
 (3) Foreign students
 (4) Overseas compatriots
 Since December 31, 2022, each team is able to register 3 or 4 general import players, and the T1 League cancelled type-III player.

Import / Type-III players

Rosters and Transactions

Coaching changes

Off-season
 On July 1, 2022, the Taoyuan Pilots hired Iurgi Caminos, the head coach of the Taichung Wagor Suns, as their new head coach.
 On July 6, 2022, the Tainan TSG GhostHawks interim head coach, Liu Meng-Chu was promoted to the new head coach.
 On September 18, 2022, the Taichung Wagor Suns assistant coach, Alberto Garcia was promoted to the new head coach.
 On October 25, 2022, the Taichung Suns named Chris Gavina as their new head coach.

In-season
 On March 3, 2023, the Tainan TSG GhostHawks assistant coach, Ma I-Hung was named as their interim head coach for one game since Liu Meng-Chu coached UCH basketball team for University Basketball Association (UBA) 2022–23 season quarterfinals series.

2022 Interleague Play 
There were 5 teams, including New Taipei CTBC DEA, Taichung Suns, Tainan TSG GhostHawks, TaiwanBeer HeroBears and Taoyuan Leopards, participated in these invitational games individually. And the Kaohsiung Aquas players, Chiu Tzu-Hsuan and Lu Wei-Ting, joined to the Chinese Taipei team in these invitational games.

Preseason 
The preseason began on October 14, 2022, and ended on October 16. The T1 League held the preseason matches at the Xinzhuang Gymnasium.

Regular season 

The regular season started on October 29, 2022 and ended on April 23, 2023. On October 29, the 2022–23 season opening game, matched by Kaohsiung Aquas and New Taipei CTBC DEA, was played at Xinzhuang Gymnasium.

League table

Postponed games due to COVID-19 
 One Kaohsiung Aquas home game (against the Taichung Suns on January 14) was postponed due to the Taichung Suns cannot reach the minimum player number.

All-Star Game 

The All-Star Game was played at Taipei Heping Basketball Gymnasium on February 28, 2023.

Playoffs 

 Play-in Series: The fourth and fifth seeds play the best-of-three play-in series. The fourth seed will be awarded a one-win advantage. The winner can qualify the semifinals series.
 Semifinals Series: The winner of play-in series and the top three seeds play the best-of-five semifinals series. The winners can qualify the finals series.
 Finals Series: The winners of the semifinals series play the best-of-seven finals series.

Bracket

Bold Series winner
Italic Team with home-court advantage

Statistics

Individual statistic leaders

Individual game highs

Team statistic leaders

Awards

Yearly awards 

All-T1 League First Team:
 
 
 
 
 

All-Defensive First Team:

Statistical awards

Finals

All-Star Game

MVP of the Month 
MVP of the Month awards were only for local players.

Import of the Month 
Import of the Month awards were only for import players and type-III players.

Arenas 
 The Taoyuan Leopards announced that they would play their home games at the National Taiwan Sport University Multipurpose Gymnasium in this season.

Media 
 The games will be broadcast on television via Eleven Sports, VL Sports and ELTA TV, and online via YouTube.
 The games will be broadcast online via Camerabay since December 16, 2022.

See also 
 2022–23 Kaohsiung Aquas season
 2022–23 New Taipei CTBC DEA season
 2022–23 Taichung Suns season
 2022–23 Tainan TSG GhostHawks season
 2022–23 TaiwanBeer HeroBears season
 2022–23 Taoyuan Leopards season

Note

References

External links 
 

2022–23 T1 League season
T
Current basketball seasons
Basketball events postponed due to the COVID-19 pandemic